FEDOR, colloquially known as Fyodor the robot, is a Russian humanoid robot that replicates movements of a remote operator and can perform some actions autonomously. Originally intended for rescue operations, it was sent on an experimental mission to the International Space Station in 2019. FEDOR is an acronym for "Final Experimental Demonstration Object Research" and a hint to the Russian male given name Fyodor (Фёдор) when transliterated without diacritics.

History
The robot, originally called Avatar, was funded by the Ministry of Emergency Situations and intended for rescue operations but its role was later expanded to include space missions. The new name, FEDOR, was announced in 2017 by then Deputy Prime Minister Dmitry Rogozin. FEDOR is intended to be a platform for development of a series of robots, although the first model was often called FEDOR in news media.

In April 2017, a video of FEDOR shooting guns caused a media alarm. Rogozin insisted Russia was not creating a Terminator. After the video was posted, one of the parts suppliers cancelled their relationship with the project.

On 22 August 2019, a FEDOR robot was launched on Soyuz MS-14 to the International Space Station. The plan was for the robot to spend a week and a half aboard the orbital outpost. The model going to space was given the name Skybot F-850.

On 24 August 2019, the Soyuz failed to dock as scheduled with the station, due to a fault with its rendezvous system.

On 27 August 2019, it successfully docked with the Zvezda module of the station.

On 30 August 2019, FEDOR successfully matched plug connectors while weightless, simulating the repair of cables on the station's exterior surface during a spacewalk.

On 6 September 2019, the reentry capsule of the Soyuz MS-14 spacecraft, with FEDOR on board but no crew, landed in the designated area in the steppes of Kazakhstan, south-east of the city of Zhezkazghan.··

On 11 September 2019, "Russian robot Fedor cannot fulfill his mission to replace human astronauts on space walks", Yevgeny Dudorov, executive director of robot developers Androidnaya Tekhnika said.·

On 14 December 2019, Russia's Androidnaya Tekhnika  and Japan's GITAI startup plan to create a robot to operate on the lunar surface, the Russian company's executive director, Yevgeny Dudorov, told TASS.

See also 

 Atlas (robot)
 Cimon (robot)
 Int-Ball
 Justin (robot)
 Kirobo
 Robonaut
 Vyommitra

References

External links 

Humanoid space robots
Robots of Russia
Military of Russia
Humanoid robots
2015 robots
International Space Station